The men's discus throw event at the 1980 Summer Olympics in Moscow, Soviet Union had an entry list of 18 competitors from 12 nations, with one qualifying group and the final (12) held on Monday July 28, 1980. The maximum number of athletes per nation had been set at 3 since the 1930 Olympic Congress. The event was won by Viktor Rashchupkin of the Soviet Union, the nation's first medal and first victory in the men's discus throw. Imrich Bugár put Czechoslovakia back on the podium in the event after a one-Games absence, taking silver. Luis Delís earned Cuba's first men's discus throw medal with his bronze. The United States, which had earned at least one medal in every appearance of the event prior to 1980, missed the podium due to the boycott.

Background

This was the 19th appearance of the event, which is one of 12 athletics events to have been held at every Summer Olympics. Returning finalists from the 1976 Games were silver medalist Wolfgang Schmidt of East Germany and tenth-place finisher Velko Velev of Bulgaria. Schmidt was the 1978 European champion and world record holder as well, but was bothered by an ankle injury. That injury, along with the absence of the American team due to boycott (1976 Olympic champion Mac Wilkins was still a top thrower, and four-time gold medalist Al Oerter had come out of retirement) left the competition open.

Kuwait and Syria each made their debut in the men's discus throw. Sweden made its 15th appearance, most of any nation competing, though tied with Hungary for second behind the United States's 18 appearances.

Competition format

The competition used the two-round format introduced in 1936, with the qualifying round completely separate from the divided final. In qualifying, each athlete received three attempts; those recording a mark of at least 62.00 metres advanced to the final. If fewer than 12 athletes achieved that distance, the top 12 would advance. The results of the qualifying round were then ignored. Finalists received three throws each, with the top eight competitors receiving an additional three attempts. The best distance among those six throws counted.

Records

Prior to the competition, the existing world and Olympic records were as follows.

No new world or Olympic records were set during the competition.

Schedule

All times are Moscow Time (UTC+3)

Results

Qualifying round 

The qualifying round was held on Sunday July 27, 1980.

Final

The home-nation officials may have provided some assistance to Raschupkin, as "Cuba's Luis Delís's final throw appeared to be a winning mark, but some observers thought it was marked at least a foot short."

See also
 1978 Men's European Championships Discus Throw (Prague)
 1982 Men's European Championships Discus Throw (Athens)
 1983 Men's World Championships Discus Throw (Helsinki)
 1986 Men's European Championships Discus Throw (Stuttgart)
 1987 Men's World Championships Discus Throw (Rome)

References

External links
 Results

D
Discus throw at the Olympics
Men's events at the 1980 Summer Olympics